Henry G. Harrison (1813–1895) was a noted English architect who was apparently active in New York City 
between 1853 and 1891.

Several of his works in the United States are listed on the U.S. National Register of Historic Places.

Works include (with attribution):
James William Beekman House, West Shore Rd. Oyster Bay, New York, Gothic Revival work (Harrison, Henry G.), NRHP-listed
 A. T. Stewart Era Buildings, 4th, 5th, and 6th Sts., Cathedral and Cherry Valley Aves. Garden City, New York (Harrison, Henry G.), NRHP-listed
Trinity Cathedral (Omaha, Nebraska), 113 N. 18th St. Omaha, Nebraska, (Harrison, Henry G.), NRHP-listed

References

External links
 Henry G. Harrison furniture designs, 1882-circa 1883. Held by the Department of Drawings & Archives, Avery Architectural & Fine Arts Library, Columbia University.

1813 births
1895 deaths
19th-century English architects
Architects from New York (state)
19th-century American architects
British emigrants to the United States